Haba may refer to:

 Habermaaß, a.k.a. Haba, a German toy maker
 Haba, Togo, a village in the Bassar Prefecture in the Kara Region of north-western Togo
 Haba Xueshan, a mountain in Yunnan, China
 La Haba, a municipality located in the province of Badajoz, Extremadura, Spain
 Spanish name for Vicia faba, the fava bean, or for Phaseolus lunatus, the Haba bean
 Alois Hába (1893 – 1973), Czech composer, music theorist and teacher.

See also
 Haba Station (disambiguation)
 Habas (disambiguation)